Axel Erik Bäck (born 23 December 1987) is an alpine skier from Sweden.  Born in Saltsjöbaden, he competed for Sweden at the 2010 Winter Olympics where he was disqualified from the second run in the slalom.

On 7 April 2016 his retirement from alpine skiing was announced.

World Cup results

Season standings

References

External links

 
 
 

1987 births
Living people
People from Nacka Municipality
Swedish male alpine skiers
Olympic alpine skiers of Sweden
Alpine skiers at the 2010 Winter Olympics
Alpine skiers at the 2014 Winter Olympics
Sportspeople from Stockholm County
21st-century Swedish people